Manassas Park City Schools is a school division that serves the city of Manassas Park, Virginia, United States. The district administers a total of four schools (2 elementary and 2 secondary).

History

Schools 
Manassas Park City Schools first opened in 1976 with four schools Conner Elementary School, Independence Elementary School,  Manassas Park Elementary School, and Manassas Park High School. The elementary schools served grades K-6, and the high school served grades 7-12.

In 1981, Independence Elementary School was closed due to loss of enrollment, and then re-opened in 1984 with one wing serving preschool and kindergarten. In the 1985–1986 school year, Manassas Park implemented the all city concept by having Independence Elementary serve Preschool and Kindergarten, Manassas Park Elementary serve grades 1–3, Conner Elementary serve grades 4–6, Manassas Park Intermediate serve grades 7–8, and Manassas Park High School serve grades 9-12.

In July 1999, the building for Cougar Elementary School. After Cougar opened, Conner Elementary and Independence Elementary would close, Manassas Park Elementary School would house grades 4–5, and grade 6, formerly housed in Conner Elementary, would be moved to Manassas Park Middle School.

Former Superintendents 
Robert Strickland served as the first Manassas Park City Schools first Superintendent, from 1976 to 1979. Before being appointed, he taught high school for ten years, served as a principal, administrative assistant to the superintendent, and served as superintendent in Lee County, Virginia and Pineville, Kentucky. 
Robert Lewis served as superintendent from 1979 to 1981. He served as principal of Stonewall Jackson High School (now Unity Reed High School) before being appointed superintendent.
Gary Smith was appointed superintendent in January 1982. Before being appointed he taught at Stonewall Jackson High School (now Unity Reed High School), Brentsville High School, and served as principal of Windsor High School in Isle of Wight, Virginia. (1982-1985)
Jimmy Stuart served as superintendent from 1985 to 1988.
James Moyers was appointed superintendent in 1988. Before being appointed he was the assistant superintendent. Moyers died in 1991.
David Martin served as superintendent from 1991 to 1995
Thomas H. Debolt served as Superintendent of Manassas Park City Schools from 1995- November 2010. DeBolt's vision and the history of the Manassas Park school system are captured in the book "The Little School System That Could: Transforming a City School District," by Daniel L. Duke, a professor at the University of Virginia's Curry School of Education.
C. Bruce McDade was the superintendent from December 1 of 2010 to June 30 of 2021. He was appointed associate superintendent for curriculum and technology in 2006 but started his career with the Manassas Park School system in 2001 as principal of Manassas Park High School. McDade announced that he would be retiring at the end of the 2019–2020 school year. However, due to the COVID-19 pandemic, he announced that he would stay until the end of the 2020–2021 school year.

Administration

Superintendent 
The superintendent of Manassas Park City Schools is Melissa Saunders. She began her tenure at the beginning of the 2021–2022 school year. Before being appointed Superintendent, Saunders worked in Manassas City Public Schools, where she has served as the director of student achievement from 2016 to 2021. Saunders is the first female superintendent in Manassas Park's history.

School board members 
There are currently five seats of the Manassas Park City School Board. All members are appointed.  
 Rachel Kirkland, Chair
 Paul Alexander, Vice Chair
 Stacy Seiberling
 Shaunté Jones
 Ellen Slobodnik
 Dana Williams, School Board Clerk

Schools
Manassas Park currently has four schools. 2 elementary, 1 middle school and 1 high school. All four schools in the district are fully accredited.

Elementary schools
Cougar Elementary School (K-2)

 Principal: Desiree Reynolds-Tickle
 Mascot: Mini Cougars

Manassas Park Elementary School (3-5)

 Principal: Stacey Mamon
 Mascot: Cougars

Secondary schools
Manassas Park Middle School (6–8).

 Principal: Kip Tuttle
 Mascot: Cougars

Manassas Park High School (9-12)

 Principal: Charles Forrest
 Mascot: Cougars

References

External links
 Manassas Park City Schools (official site)

School divisions in Virginia
Manassas Park, Virginia